WCU may stand for:

 Western Carolina University, Cullowhee, North Carolina, a constituent campus of the University of North Carolina system
 West Chester University of Pennsylvania, one of the 14 state universities of the Pennsylvania State System of Higher Education
 Western Colorado University
 Working Class Union, an early 20th century organization most notably associated with the Green Corn Rebellion
 World currency unit